Guardia Urbana ('Urban Guard') may refer to:

Guardia Urbana de Buenos Aires, Argentina
Guàrdia Urbana de Barcelona, Spain